Al-Thumamah, alternatively spelt as al-Thumama and pronounced as ath-Thumamah, is an arid lowland desert area situated in Wadi Thumamah at the edge of al-Armah mountains in the northeastern fringes of Riyadh in Riyadh Governorate, Saudi Arabia. Named after thumam, the Arabic word for desert bunchgrass, it is located approximately 50 miles from Riyadh and is known for hosting outdoor recreational places, most notably the Thumamah National Park. The first census of the area was conducted in 1981 during the reign of King Khalid.

Archaeological findings 
Recent archaeological excavations in the area trace the settlement's early existence to almost 8000 years during the Neolithic period.

Landmarks 

 Thumamah National Park

References 

Riyadh Province
Archaeological sites in Saudi Arabia
Neolithic sites of Asia